Systems analysis is "the process of studying a procedure or business to identify its goal and purposes and create systems and procedures that will efficiently achieve them". Another view sees system analysis as a problem-solving technique that breaks down a system into its component pieces, and how well those parts work and interact to accomplish their purpose.

The field of system analysis relates closely to requirements analysis or to operations research. It is also "an explicit formal inquiry carried out to help a decision maker identify a better course of action and make a better decision than they might otherwise have made."

The terms analysis and synthesis stems from Greek, meaning "to take apart" and "to put together," respectively. These terms are used in many scientific disciplines, from mathematics and logic to economics and psychology, to denote similar investigative procedures. The analysis is defined as "the procedure by which we break down an intellectual or substantial whole into parts," while synthesis means "the procedure by which we combine separate elements or components to form a coherent whole." System analysis researchers apply methodology to the systems involved, forming an overall picture.

System analysis is used in every field where something is developed. Analysis can also be a series of components that perform organic functions together, such as systems engineering. Systems engineering is an interdisciplinary field of engineering that focuses on how complex engineering projects should be designed and managed.

Information technology
The development of a computer-based information system includes a system analysis phase. This helps produce the data model, a precursor to creating or enhancing a database. There are several different approaches to system analysis. When a computer-based information system is developed, system analysis (according to the Waterfall model) would constitute the following steps:

 The development of a feasibility study: determining whether a project is economically, socially, technologically, and organizationally feasible
 Fact-finding measures, designed to ascertain the requirements of the system's end-users (typically involving interviews, questionnaires, or visual observations of work on the existing system)
 Gauging how the end-users would operate the system (in terms of general experience in using computer hardware or software), what the system would be used for, and so on

Another view outlines a phased approach to the process. This  approach breaks system analysis into 5 phases:

 Scope Definition: Clearly defined objectives and requirements necessary to meet a project's requirements as defined by its stakeholders
 Problem analysis: the process of understanding problems and needs and arriving at solutions that meet them
 Requirements analysis: determining the conditions that need to be met
 Logical design: looking at the logical relationship among the objects
 Decision analysis: making a final decision
 
Use cases are widely used system analysis modeling tools for identifying and expressing the functional requirements of a system. Each use case is a business scenario or event for which the system must provide a defined response. Use cases evolved from the object-oriented analysis.

Policy analysis
The discipline of what is today known as policy analysis originated from the application of system analysis when it was first instituted by United States Secretary of Defense Robert McNamara.

Practitioners
Practitioners of system analysis are often called up to dissect systems that have grown haphazardly to determine the current components of the system. This was shown during the year 2000 re-engineering effort as business and manufacturing processes were examined as part of the Y2K automation upgrades. Employment utilizing system analysis include system analyst, business analyst, manufacturing engineer, systems architect, enterprise architect, software architect, etc.

While practitioners of system analysis can be called upon to create new systems, they often modify, expand, or document existing systems (processes, procedures, and methods). Researchers and practitioners rely on system analysis. Activity system analysis has been already applied to various research and practice studies including business management, educational reform, educational technology, etc.

See also

Related topics 
System thinking
System architecture
Software architecture
Enterprise architecture
Systems analyst
Systems design 
Policy analysis
Program designer
Cybernetics
Systems theory

Types of system analysis
Accident analysis
Business analysis
Cost-effectiveness analysis / cost-benefit analysis
DSRP
Failure analysis
Logico-linguistic modeling
Morphological analysis
Soft systems methodology
Software prototyping
Spiral model
Waterfall model

System thinkers
Donella Meadows
Nancy Leveson
Russell L. Ackoff
Howard T. Odum
Henry Paynter
Jay Forrester
Gregory Bateson
Stewart Brand
Buckminster Fuller
Robert S. McNamara
Stafford Beer
Ludwig von Bertalanffy

References

Selected publications 
 Bentley, Lonnie D., Kevin C. Dittman, and Jeffrey L. Whitten. System analysis and design methods. (1986, 1997, 2004).
 Hawryszkiewycz, Igor T. Introduction to system analysis and design. Prentice-Hall PTR, 1994.
 Whitten, Jeffery L., Lonnie D. Bentley, and Kevin C. Dittman. Fundamentals of system analysis and design methods. (2004).

External links

A useful set of guides and a case study about the practical application of business and system analysis methods
A comprehensive description of the discipline of system analysis from Simmons College, Boston, MA, USA (Archive of original from www.simmons.edu)
System Analysis and Design introductory level lessons

 
Futures techniques
Financial analysts